Como Te Extraño is the second studio album by American Tejano music singer Pete Astudillo. It was released on November 21, 1995 through EMI Latin. The album was produced by A. B. Quintanilla, who played alongside Astudillo as part of Selena y Los Dinos, a band fronted by Selena. Como Te Extraño was a commercial success peaking at number six on the US Billboard Top Latin Albums chart and number two on the US Billboard Regional Mexican Albums chart. The title track, "Como Te Extraño", was a tribute song for Astudillo's mother and Selena (who was shot and killed eight months prior to the release of the album). The title track peaked atop the US Billboard Regional Mexican Songs chart, while the album's second single "Si No Fui Yo" peaked at number 38 on the US Billboard Hot Latin Songs chart. The album also contains "Contigo Quiero Estar", Selena's 1989 debut single with EMI Latin. Como Te Extraño won the Tejano Music Award for Album of the Year - Orchestra at the 1996 Tejano Music Awards.

Track listing

Charts

See also 

 Selena albums discography
 Latin American music in the United States

References

External links 

1995 albums
Pete Astudillo albums
Albums produced by A.B. Quintanilla
EMI Latin albums
Tejano Music Award winners for Album of the Year
Spanish-language albums
Albums recorded at Q-Productions